Patricia Firman (1922 – June 1980)  was an Australian model, actress and TV personality.

She began her career aged 14 when discovered by Cinesound Productions. She was a contender for the female lead in Forty Thousand Horsemen but lost to Betty Bryant.

She was an early panellist on the Beauty and the Beast TV show and had her own program Penthouse.

She died of cancer in June 1980

Select film credits
100,000 Cobbers (1942) – film
Another Threshold (1942) – film
Australia Is Like This (1944)
Beauty and the Beast (1964–74)

Select theatre credits
Mannequins (1938) – play
Three Cornered Moon (1938) – play
Spring Tide (1941) – play – Minerva Theatre, Sydney 1941
The Wind and the Rain Theatre Royal, Sydney 1944
The Maid of the Mountains – Theatre Royal, Adelaide 1945
The Merry Widow – Theatre Royal, Adelaide 1945
Dangerous Corner – Minerva Theatre, Sydney 1946
Youth at the Helm – Minerva, Sydney 1946
Sweetest and Lowest: A Revue – Minvera, Sydney 1947
The Little Hut – Theatre Royal, Adelaide 1956
Both Ends Meet – Theatre Royal, Adelaide 1956

References

External links

Pat Firman's Australian theatre credits at AusStage

Australian film actresses
Australian television actresses
1922 births
1980 deaths